Grupo Desportivo Juventude de Viana, formerly Enama de Viana, is an Angolan sports club based in the municipality of Viana, Luanda. The club has a men's roller hockey team competing at the local level, at the Luanda Provincial Roller Hockey Championship and at the Angolan Roller Hockey Championship. Additionally, the team has been a regular contestant at the African Roller Hockey Clubs Championship.

In the 2006 world roller hockey club championship held in Luanda, Angola, the club ranked 10th, among 12 teams  whereas in 2008, in Reus, Spain, the club ranked 15th, among 16 teams.

Juventude de Viana won the second edition of the African Roller Hockey Club Championship held in 2008 in Luanda, Angola whereas in the following edition, in 2010, in Pretoria, South Africa, it ranked second.

Honours
Angola Hockey League :
Winner (4): 2006, 2007, 2008, 2011
 Runner Up (5) : 2004, 2005, 2010, 2012, 2013

Angola Cup :
Winner (7): 2003, 2007, 2008, 2009, 2010, 2011, 2013
 Runner Up (4) : 2004, 2005, 2006, 2012

Angola Super Cup :
Winner (4): 2005, 2008, 2011, 2014
 Runner Up (1) : 2010

The President's Cup :
Winner (5): 1994, 2004, 2005, 2007, 2010
 Runner Up (0) :

African Champions League :
Winner (1): 2008
 Runner Up (1) : 2010

Managers

Players

See also
Juventude de Viana Basketball

References

Sports clubs in Angola
Roller hockey clubs in Angola